José Carlos Burgos Aquino (born 16 June 1983) was a Paraguayan former professional footballer who played as a forward.

Honours
Guaraní
 Paraguayan Primera División: 2010 Apertura

References
 
 

1983 births
Living people
Paraguayan footballers
Association football forwards
12 de Octubre Football Club players
Club Nacional footballers
C.D. Huachipato footballers
Deportes Concepción (Chile) footballers
Sportivo Luqueño players
Paraguayan expatriate sportspeople in Chile
Expatriate footballers in Chile
Paraguayan expatriate sportspeople in Ecuador
Expatriate footballers in Ecuador
Paraguayan expatriate sportspeople in Argentina
Expatriate footballers in Argentina